Polmood is a small settlement in southern Scotland near Tweedsmuir in the Scottish Borders, in the valley of the  River Tweed.

Polmood was for many centuries the centre of the Hunter family in the lowlands and the earliest record was a charter dated 1057 to Norman Hunter of Polmood. It was once a Peel tower, part of a chain of beacons running down the Tweed Valley. At the end of the nineteenth century the temporary Talla Railway was built close to Polmont to deliver building materials during the construction of the Talla Reservoir.

The estate was acquired by Mitchell Mitchell-Thomson, an Edinburgh businessman and politician who took his baronetcy title from the Peeblesshire estate of Polmood  which he had acquired before 1916.

Polmood is commemorated in "The Piper of Polmood" a piece based on old Scottish folk-tunes by Victor Babin.

In fiction
A Norman Hunter of Polmood, described as the ninth of that name and chief forester of the King of Scotland, features as one of the main characters in The Bridal of Polmood, a tale by James Hogg, the Ettrick Shepherd.

See also
List of places in the Scottish Borders
List of places in Scotland

References

External links

Hunter of Polmood
Geographia
Michael Forbes Tweedie The History of the Tweedie or Tweedy Family (1902)

Villages in the Scottish Borders
Peel towers in the Scottish Borders

References